David Johnson Naylor (November 14, 1843 – February 7, 1926) was a Union Navy sailor in the American Civil War and a recipient of the U.S. military's highest decoration, the Medal of Honor, for his actions at the Battle of Mobile Bay.

Naylor was born on November 14, 1843, in Thompsonville, New York. Naylor was still living in that state when he joined the Navy. At the Battle of Mobile Bay on August 5, 1864, he supplied gunpowder to one of his ship's Parrott rifles as a powder boy. For this action, he was awarded the Medal of Honor four months later, on December 31, 1864.

Naylor's official Medal of Honor citation reads:
Served on board the U.S.S. Oneida in the engagement at Mobile Bay, 5 August 1864. Acting as powder boy at the 30-pounder Parrott rifle, Naylor had his passing box shot from his hands and knocked overboard where it fell in one of the Galena's boats which was under the bow. Jumping overboard, Naylor recovered his box, returned to his station and continued to carry out his courageous actions throughout the engagement which resulted in the capture of the rebel ram Tennessee and the damaging of Fort Morgan.

Naylor died on February 7, 1926, at age 82 and was buried at River Bend Cemetery in Westerly, Rhode Island.

References

External links 
 

1843 births
1926 deaths
Union Navy sailors
Burials in Rhode Island
People from Thompson, New York
Military personnel from New York (state)
People of New York (state) in the American Civil War
United States Navy Medal of Honor recipients
American Civil War recipients of the Medal of Honor